There are several undocumented languages of Lembata. Lembata language may refer to any of these, but especially:
West Lembata language
South Lembata language